James Campbell McGonnigal (born August 6, 1975 in Weymouth, Massachusetts) is an American voice actor, producer, activist and director, who has worked for various companies such as 4Kids Entertainment, Central Park Media, NYAV Post, DuArt Film and Video and Funimation.

Biography

As the founding Artistic Producer of The World AIDS Day Concerts and as a Founding Producer of the New York Musical Theatre Festival, McGonnigal presented the New York Premiere of Stephen Schwartz' Children of Eden, the first major NY revisitation of Pippin starring Rosie O'Donnell, Laura Benanti, Michael Arden, and Ben Vereen, Snoopy The Musical (starring Tony Award-Winner Sutton Foster), The Secret Garden starring Laura Benanti, Will Chase, and Stephen Pasquale (named in top ten theatre events of 2005 by Playbill.com), Rags at Nokia Theatre Times Square (starring Lainie Kazan, Carolee Carmello, and Eden Espinosa), and the first major revival of the cult hit Runaways by Elizabeth Swados starring Ezra Miller, Max Jenkins, and Alex Brightman. His FLOPZ n' CUTZ series benefiting the Joey DiPaolo AIDS Foundation was declared a "smash" by New York's NEXT Magazine. Named a "musical theatre impresario" by Time Out New York, he has produced and/or directed more than 100 events for The Matthew Shepard Foundation, God's Love We Deliver, Broadway Cares/Equity Fights AIDS, Parkinson's Resource Organization, The National AIDS Fund, Opening Act, The Pied Piper Children's Theatre, Victims of Hurricane Katrina, Free Arts NYC, The United Nations Association HERO Campaign and Victims of the 2008 Midwest Flooding. His work has earned him National recognition as well as a special award from The 2006 New England Theatre Conference.

In 2007, McGonnigal traveled to South Africa and Namibia as an ambassador for the United Nations' HERO campaign assisting remote AIDS-affected communities. He also served on the Board of Directors for the Joey DiPaolo AIDS Foundation and acted as camp director for Camp TLC, a summer camp for inner city teens living with HIV/AIDS [www.jdaf.org] from 2005-2008. Additionally in 2007, McGonnigal founded the Broadway Loves the 80s Concerts, hosted by Mo Rocca and featuring performances from Jamie-Lynn Sigler, Kate Shindle, Michael Urie, Becki Newton, Julia Murney and Tony Vincent.

Inspired by the passing of California's Proposition 8, McGonnigal began discussions with several leaders in the LGBT Community and started the website talkaboutequality.

In 2010, McGonnigal founded Take Back Pride, a campaign to put the elements of activism back in Pride Marches around the country. The movement has now swept 17 cities and 4 countries thus far.

McGonnigal lives in Washington, D.C. He lives with his husband and son. For four years, McGonnigal served as the Community Director for the New Organizing Institute, where he led RootsCamp, an annual progressive political conference. He is currently the Vice President of Sales for Impactive. In a 2021 interview, he claimed that his involvement in community theater as a child may have led him to the realization that he was gay.

Filmography

Animation
 Arcade Gamer Fubuki - Sanpeita
 Beck: Mongolian Chop Squad - Yoshito Morozumi
 Big Windup! - Kanou
 Chaotic - Hot Shot, Vlar
 El Cazador de la Bruja - L.A.
 (King of Braves): GaoGaiGar - Penchinon
 Gokusen - Haruhiko "Uchi" Uchiyama
 Huntik: Secrets & Seekers - Tersely
 Kizuna: Bonds of Love - Ranmaru Samejima
 Jungle Emperor Leo - Lemonade
 Nabari no Ō - Additional Voices
 Magic User's Club - Takeo Takakura
 Mobile Suit Gundam Unicorn - Additional Voices
 MoonPhase - Additional Voices
 One Piece - Corporal (Episodes 136 - 138) (Funimation dub)
 Patlabor - Bud Renard
 Peach Girl - Nao
 RIN: Daughters of Mnemosyne - Yahagi
 World of Narue - Kazuto Iizuka
 Three Delivery - Eugene
 Weiss Kreuz - Omi Tsukiyono
 Weathering Continent - Tieh
 Viva Pinata - Teddington Twingersnap

Video games
 Shadow Hearts: From The New World (PS2) - Johnny Garland, Roy McManus
 Bullet Witch (Xbox 360) - Jonathan
 Viva Pinata (Xbox 360) - Teddington Twingersnaps

Production staff

Producer/director (theater)
 Runaways
 Broadway Loves Joe's Pub
 Green Concert (Makor Theatre 2006 & 2007)
 Green 2 Concert (Makor Theatre 2006 & 2007)
 NEO Concert (York Theatre Company 2003)
 Broadway Loves the 80's (Volumes 1, 2, 3, 4 and 5 at Joe's Pub - 2007, 2008, 2009)
 Embrace! Concerts for The Matthew Shepard Foundation-2004,2005,2006
 Standing Ovations 1, 2 & 3 for Broadway Cares/Equity Fights AIDS
 Miracle Concerts for God's Love We Deliver 2003, 2004, 2005, 2006
 FLOPZ & CUTZ Series 2005, 2006, 2007, 2008, 2009
 ASS BACKWARDS AKA Glory Days In Concert at Joe's Pub 2007
 Become, the Music of Pasek & Paul, a concert featuring the music of Benj Pasek and Justin Paul Joe's Pub 2005
 Laura Benanti: Blame It On My Youth at Feinstein's 2006
 Laura Bell Bundy in Shameless! Joe's Pub, 2004

Artistic producer/other 
 World AIDS Day Concerts 
 Children of Eden - 2003, Pippin -2004, The Secret Garden -2005, Rags 2006

References

External links
 
 
 
 Jamie McGonnigal at Crystal Acids Voice Actor Database
 

1975 births
Living people
American male stage actors
American male video game actors
American male voice actors
American theatre directors
American theatre managers and producers
American gay actors
American LGBT rights activists
Funimation
LGBT people from Massachusetts
Massachusetts Democrats
People from Weymouth, Massachusetts
21st-century American male actors
American people of Scottish descent